Federmesser group is an archaeological umbrella term 
including the late Upper Paleolithic to Mesolithic cultures of the  Northern European Plain, dating to between 14,000  and 12,800 years ago (the late Magdalenian). It is closely related to the Tjongerian culture, as both have been suggested.
It includes the Tjongerian sites at Lochtenrek in the Frisian part of the Netherland, spanning the area of  Belgium, the Netherlands, northern France, northern Germany, southern Denmark, and Poland (Tarnowian and Witowian cultures). It is also closely related to the Creswellian culture to the west and the Azilian to the south. The name is derived from the characteristic small backed flint blades, in German termed  Federmesser ("quill knife"). It is succeeded by the Ahrensburg culture after 12,800 BP.

See also
 Late Glacial Maximum 
 Ahrensburg culture
 Hamburg culture
 Magdalenian
 Kozarnika
 Laacher See

References

Magdalenian
Mesolithic cultures of Europe
Archaeological cultures of Central Europe
Archaeological cultures of Western Europe
Paleolithic cultures of Europe
Archaeological cultures in Belgium
Archaeological cultures in Germany
Archaeological cultures in the Netherlands